The 2015 Kent State Golden Flashes football team represented Kent State University in the 2015 NCAA Division I FBS football season. They were led by third-year head coach Paul Haynes and played their home games at Dix Stadium as a member of the East Division of the Mid-American Conference. They finished the season 3–9, 2–6 in MAC play to finish in a three-way tie for fifth place in the East Division.

Schedule

Schedule Source:

Game summaries

at Illinois

Delaware State

at Minnesota

Marshall

Miami (OH)

at Toledo

at Massachusetts

Bowling Green

Buffalo

at Ohio

Central Michigan

at Akron

References

Kent State
Kent State Golden Flashes football seasons
Kent State Golden Flashes football